Femicide is the act of murdering women, because they are women. Mexico, particularly in Ciudad Juárez, is one of the leading countries in the amount of femicides that occur each year. This escalation of violence began in the early 1990's and was followed by a wave sexual violence and torture, abductions, increasing rates of women being murdered because of their gender. In their attempts to understand the causes of this brutality, researchers found that the majority of women are murdered by their current or ex partners. Additionally, the violence is also a result of what is known as the backlash theory, a phenomenon in which when a marginalized group gains more rights within their society, there is a violent backlash from their oppressors. The response from the Mexican government has been relatively minimal as there is very little legislation protecting women. The lack of response also serves as a form of controlling women and quelling feminist movements as exacerbates fear of violence. Local police and government officials are known to dismiss instances of women going missing and in some cases have been found to be in connection with various instances of violence against women. There have been many small feminist movements that have attempted to bring attention to the level of violence that Mexican women face. These movements primarily focus their efforts through demonstrations, sharing their own experiences, and creating works of art to express their frustrations.

Mexico officially began documenting the amount of femicide occurrences in 2012. The country's femicide rate exceeded more than 1,000 femicides in the year 2021. The reports gathered over the last few years displays that on average, 10 girls or women are killed daily in Mexico. The high murder rate in the country has continued to make international news, while directing attention to Mexico's President Andrés Manuel López Obrador's decision-making abilities to maintain criminal activity to a minimum. The amount of femicides have gradually increased since the early 1990's, that in more recent years, now make up 10 percent of all homicides reported in 2019.

Risk factors and roadblocks 
Violence against women is ultimately the result of gender discrimination. Feminist movements have been active in bringing attention to femicide however this has had an adverse impact as a result of the backlash theory in action.  Mexican women gained more autonomy in a patriarchal society resulting in a violent response from their oppressors, which in this case is men.  Furthermore, while femicide and gender based violence is an issue that impacts all women there are certain risk factors that have led to some women facing a disproportionate amount of violence. Low-income women in particular are more likely to be victim to femicide than their middle-class and upper-class peers. Indigenous women are also vulnerable but in a different way. Geography is the main obstacle in the femicide and other violence Indigenous women face as offices that report these instances are not location near Indigenous communities. This makes it more challenging to quantify the level of violence they face as it goes under-reported. Other roadblocks to quantifying the violence Mexican women experience is a general misunderstanding of what femicide is. Many people view femicide as the same as any other kind of murder rather that a targeted attack on the basis of gender. Femicide being lumped in with other kinds of violence erases the gender aspect and the motivations.

Feminist movements 
Until recent decades, feminism was treated as a dirty word. As the violence rose in Mexico this sentiment faded. As more women became victims to violence the general disdain towards feminism and its ideals became less common among women and many began fighting for justice of murdered women. Mexican women began to take to the streets to march in large demonstrations. These marches called for the acknowledgement of the gender based violence women face. Mexican feminists created the term "feminicidio" (femicide) to describe the way some women are murdered because they are women. They urged their community members to recognize this kind of violence deviates from other kinds of murder and see it as a different issue. The main participants in this movement are the loved ones of those who have been victims of femicide. Their loved ones use various forms of media to spread the stories of those who lost their lives in the violence. Their efforts birthed many organizations that act to keep women in Mexico safe from violence as well as informed about it. Social media and the #MeToo movement transformed the movement through changing the culture of shame and fear that came with coming forward about sexual violence. Women naming their abusers publicly became normalized as a result.

Police response 
The response to the increase in violence from both the local police and Mexican government has been consistently inadequate. Police officers are known to downplay instances of women going missing. and to be slow to respond to reports of violence or missing people. These sluggish responses result in death as time is of the essence in disappearance cases. Additionally, actual investigations are often not conducted properly which compromises their integrity and ultimately making it more difficult for victims to get justice. Crime scenes do not get sealed, autopsies are mishandled, and victims do not get identified. In the case of prosecution, people are tortured into giving false confessions to take accountability for more murders than they are responsible for. Falsification of evidence also contributes to innocent people being arrested. In many places in Mexico, police officers themselves have been found to be in connection with the murders. Furthermore, victims are frequently blamed for their deaths and families perspectives of their deceased loved ones are treated with skepticism.

Femicides as well as other kinds of gender based violence are allowed to occur by the Mexican government to because it makes women afraid, with the intention of preventing feminist movements as well as any kind of further liberation for Mexican women. Police officers turn a blind eye and politicians do not create regulations to protect women because letting the violence occur reinforces patriarchal standards. When women are more focused on fearing for their lives, activist circles are more difficult to sustain.

Activists in Mexico as well as other human rights organizations have criticized the Mexican government for its conduct and claimed these actions are human rights violations.

National protocols 
Following the disappearance of Mónica Citlalli Díaz in a suburb of Mexico City in November, 2022, the Supreme Court President Arturo Zaldívar placed a national protocol to investigate all femicides along with all other homicides targeted towards women under any circumstance. Efforts have been previously made by certain states in Mexico to create prosecutor's offices specifically for gender based crimes given the increasing numbers of homicides. Since 2015, the federal government declared multiple gender violence alerts in order to urge local, state and federal authorities to take the necessary emergency action in particular regions so that they could provide the public with vital security measures and justice for victims and affected communities.

See also 

 Violence against women in Mexico

References 

Mexico
Violence against women in Mexico